Sorry 4 What is the seventh studio album by Canadian rapper and singer Tory Lanez. It was released through One Umbrella on September 30, 2022. The album features guest appearances from A Boogie wit da Hoodie and Yoko Gold, Lanez's younger brother. Production was handled by a variety of record producers, including Lanez himself, Smash David, Play Picasso, Jakik, Half, and Sergio R., among others. It was supported by one single, "Why Did I", which was released alongside the accompanying official music video on the same day that the album was released.

Background

Exactly two weeks before the release of the album, Lanez announced its title and release date, while he also revealed that it would have 18 tracks before adding two more later.

Singles

Sorry 4 What  was supported by one single. The lead single, "Why Did I" was released on September 23, 2022. The music video was released accompanying the single.

Commercial performance
Sorry 4 What debuted at number ten on the US Billboard 200 chart, earning 25,500 album-equivalent units (including 1,000 copies in pure album sales) in its first week. This became Tory Lanez’s seventh US top-ten debut on the chart. The album also accumulated a total of 32.06 million on-demand official streams from the set’s songs.

Track listing

Charts

References

2022 albums
Tory Lanez albums